Steven Opondo (born ) is a Kenyan male weightlifter, competing in the 85 kg category and representing Kenya at international competitions. He participated at the 2014 Commonwealth Games in the 85 kg event, he is coached by David Adeyemo.

Major competitions

References

1994 births
Living people
Kenyan male weightlifters
Place of birth missing (living people)
Weightlifters at the 2014 Commonwealth Games
Commonwealth Games competitors for Kenya
20th-century Kenyan people
21st-century Kenyan people